The Star Award for Movie Actress of the Year is one of the PMPC Star Award for Movies recognizing the outstanding films in the Philippines every year. It was founded by the Philippine Movie Press Club since 1985.

Winners and nominees
The list may be incomplete such as some of the names of the nominees and the roles portrayed especially during the early years of PMPC Star Award For Movie.

In the lists below, the winner of the award for each year is shown first, followed by the other nominees.

References

Film awards for lead actress